Netherlands Foreign Investment Agency (NFIA) is an operational unit of the Dutch Ministry of Economic Affairs. It assists foreign companies wishing to establish their business in the Netherlands and to take advantage of the Dutch business environment as a strategic base to cover Europe. The NFIA was established for the specific purpose of helping and advising such companies by providing them with advice, information and practical assistance, quickly and on a confidential basis, as well as providing them access to a broad network of business partners and government institutions. The NFIA was founded in 1978, and was positioned as a job machine at the time. The idea that foreign companies are good for the economic dynamics and competitiveness of the Netherlands is claimed  to be "the guiding principle for the work of the NFIA today".

External links
Netherlands Foreign Investment Agency

Government agencies of the Netherlands
Investment promotion agencies
Finance in the Netherlands